The election of the Head of State of Costa Rica in 1844 was the first Costa Rican election in which the system of direct suffrage was used to elect the Supreme Head of State, in accordance with the provisions of the Constitution of April 9, 1844. A method that was abolished by the next election returning to indirect suffrage until 1913.

The candidacy of Oreamuno triumphed unanimously at the polling stations of Bagaces, Boruca, West Cartago, South Cartago, Cot, Guanacaste, La Union, Orosí, Paraiso, Quircot, San Pablo de Heredia, Santa Cruz, Térraba, Tobosi and Tucurrique, and won comfortable victories in Cartago center, Curridabat, Desamparados, Heredia center, San José north and San José south. Alfaro won at the polls of West Alajuela, East Alajuela, Atenas, Barva, Cañas, Esparza and Puntarenas, Nicoya and San Juan del Murciélago. Mora triumphed in Escazú and Pacaca, and Blanco in Aserrí. None of the other candidates managed to win polls.

On November 15, 1844, the legislative chambers declared Francisco María Oreamuno Bonilla elected as Head of State for the period 1844-1848. Oreamuno took possession on November 29, 1844.

References

Elections in Costa Rica
1844 elections in Central America
1844 in Costa Rica